Self-control is the motivation to control oneself.

Self control or Self Control may also refer to:

Music
Self Control (album), a 1984 album by Laura Branigan
 "Self Control" (Raf song), 1984, covered by Laura Branigan the same year
 "Self Control" (Dukes song), 2010
 "Self Control" (Youngboy Never Broke Again song), 2019
 "Self Control", by Bebe Rexha from the 2018 album Expectations
 "Self Control", by Frank Ocean from the 2016 album Blonde
 "Self Control", by Kate Boy from the 2015 album One
 "Self Control", by Scissor Sisters from the 2012 album Magic Hour
 "Self Control", a 1970 song by The Upsetters

Film and television
 Self Control (film), 1938 Donald Duck film
 "Self Control" (Agents of S.H.I.E.L.D.), season 4 episode

Literature
 Self-Control (novel), a novel by Scottish novelist Mary Brunton

See also 
No Self Control (disambiguation)